"Dead and Gone" is a song by American hip hop recording artist T.I., featuring American singer-songwriter Justin Timberlake. It was released on January 12, 2009 as the eighth single from T.I.'s sixth studio album, Paper Trail (2008). Due to the high number of digital downloads upon the album's release, the song debuted on the Billboard Hot 100 before its official single release. The song marked the second collaboration between T.I. and Justin Timberlake, the first being the hit single "My Love", from Timberlake's second album, FutureSex/LoveSounds (2006).

T.I. and Timberlake performed this song at the 51st Grammy Awards. The song was later nominated twice at the 52nd Grammy Awards, for Best Rap/Sung Collaboration and Best Rap Song. It was the 10th bestselling digital single of 2009 in the United States. As of early February 2018, it had sold 3.5 million copies in the country.

Background and composition

Rob Knox, one of the song's producers, expressed his feelings about creating the song:

"Dead and Gone" is a hip hop beat. In the song, T.I. deals with the death of his best friend and former bodyguard, Philant Johnson, who was killed on May 3, 2006, when T.I.'s crew was caught up in a shooting after a show in Cincinnati that left three injured and Johnson dead. The lyrics include lines such as: "Whoever thought I'd never see Philant no more," and "Big Phil this is for you." Johnson's tombstone is shown in the video.

There are two radio edits. One with the intro and outro cut off, and the explicit words being censored. Another edit, had cut the intro, the first chorus from Justin Timberlake, and the outro of the song, as well as replaced explicit words with less-offensive words. "Dead And Gone" is set in common time with a tempo of 84 beats per minute and is set in the key of A minor, with a chord sequence of Am-C-G-F-E.

Release
The song was first confirmed as the next single by co-producer Rob Knox. T.I. later confirmed the release of the single himself. Song was first made available to digital download on September 29, 2008. It was sent to US rhythmic and contemporary hit radio on January 12, 2009. On March 26, 2009 12-inch vinyl was released.

Reception
Sputnikmusic was extremely positive in its review: "You can't help but not skip the track. "Dead and Gone", yet another Timberlake / T.I. track is bolstered by its impressive Timbaland beat [although he is not the producer of the song] and the fact that it ends the album on a very, very strong note."

Before the single was announced, the track debuted at number 76 on the Billboard Hot 100 due to high downloads as an album track. Following its official release as a single, the song made a re-entry on the chart at number 99 and was able to reach number two for five consecutive weeks. After reaching its peak, the following week it fell to the number four position and then to number 6. It is T.I.'s fourth consecutive top 5 hit on the Hot 100 from Paper Trail, and seventh of his career as a lead artist. On the Hot R&B/Hip-Hop Songs Billboard sub-chart it also reached number two. The song reached number one on the Billboard Hot Rap Tracks and the Hot 100 Airplay chart on the week of March 14, 2009. It also peaked at number nine on the Billboard Pop 100 Airplay chart and number three on the Billboard Pop 100 chart. It was the 10th best-selling digital single of 2009 in the United States.

In the United Kingdom, the song made a strong debut at number 30 on the UK Singles Chart, and the following week climbed to number 17 and peaked at number four. In Canada, it debuted at number 59 on the Canadian Hot 100 the same week it did as in the U.S., and after its physical release it made a re-entry at number 70 and has now peaked at number three. As of February 2018, the song has sold 3.5 million copies in the US.

Music video
The video was directed by Chris Robinson and was filmed in the first week of February in Lancaster, California. It surfaced on the internet a few hours before the official release date on February 17. In it, T.I. is filmed driving through a desert landscape, interspersed with shots of Justin Timberlake standing alone in the desert or playing a piano.  T.I. eventually drives up in a '67 Camaro SS and meets with Timberlake and they continue the song together as the camera circles around them.  Shortly before the final rendition of the chorus, there is a break in the music and a brief montage of images, with the words "good", "evil", and "redemption", appears.  As the song draws to a close, T.I. is seen returning to his car and driving off, leaving Timberlake standing alone once again in the dark, with his piano set ablaze in the background. The very end of the video shows T.I. getting out of the car and entering a prison whose gates close behind him. This is a cliffhanger that is resolved in "Remember Me".

The video ranked at number 34 on BET's Notarized: Top 100 Videos of 2009 countdown.

Track listings
Digital single
 "Dead and Gone" (feat. Justin Timberlake) – 4:59 

12-inch vinyl
 "Dead and Gone" (feat. Justin Timberlake) [Radio Version] – 3:53
 "Dead and Gone" (feat. Justin Timberlake) [Amended Album Version] – 4:59
 "Dead and Gone" (feat. Justin Timberlake) [Explicit Album Version] – 4:59
 "Dead and Gone" (Instrumental) – 4:59

Charts

Weekly charts

Year-end charts

Certifications

Release history

Covers and parodies
 "Dead and Gone" – Travis Garland – This version was produced in January 2009 by Nicholas "RAS" Furlong, and written and performed by boy band NLT member Travis Garland. It was released in March 2009.
 "Dead and Gone" – Metro Station
 "Dead and Gone" – Cute Is What We Aim For – Released on Punk Goes Pop 3.
 "Things Gotta Change" – Avery Storm
 "I Don't Like White People" – Rucka Rucka Ali – This version was produced in 2009 and released for purchase in September 2010, this version was released on Rucka Rucka Ali's album I'm Black, You're White & These Are Clearly Parodies.

See also
 List of Billboard Hot 100 top-ten singles in 2009
 List of UK R&B Singles Chart number ones of 2009

References

2008 singles
Grand Hustle Records singles
Justin Timberlake songs
Music videos directed by Chris Robinson (director)
T.I. songs
Commemoration songs
Songs written by Justin Timberlake
Songs written by T.I.
Song recordings produced by Justin Timberlake
2008 songs
Songs written by Rob Knox (producer)